The 2011 Volkswagen Challenger was a professional tennis tournament played on carpet. It was the 18th edition of the tournament which was part of the 2011 ATP Challenger Tour. It took place in Wolfsburg, Germany between 21 and 27 February 2011.

ATP entrants

Seeds

 Rankings are as of February 14, 2011.

Other entrants
The following players received wildcards into the singles main draw:
  Victor Baluda
  Jaan-Frederik Brunken
  Peter Gojowczyk
  Jimmy Wang

The following players received entry from the qualifying draw:
  Andre Begemann
  Farrukh Dustov
  Dieter Kindlmann
  Stefan Seifert

Champions

Singles

 Ruben Bemelmans def.  Dominik Meffert, 6–7(8), 6–4, 6–4

Doubles

 Matthias Bachinger /  Simon Stadler def.  Dominik Meffert /  Frederik Nielsen, 3–6, 7–6(3), [10–7]

External links
Official Website
ITF Search
ATP official site

Volkswagen Challenger
Carpet court tennis tournaments
2011 in German tennis
Volkswagen Challenger